XHNLT-FM (96.1 MHz) is a radio station that serves the border area of Laredo, Texas, United States, and Nuevo Laredo, Tamaulipas, Mexico. It is owned and operated by Radio Fórmula.

XHNLT-FM broadcasts in HD.

History

XENLT-AM 1000 received its concession on May 22, 1985. It was owned by Radio Mil del Norte, S.A. de C.V. and was a daytime broadcastr with 1,000 watts. Radio Fórmula acquired it in 1997 and increased power in 1998, adding a night time service at 100 watts.

The concessionaire changed from Radio Fórmula del Norte to Radio Transmisora del Pacífico in 2016.

In 2017, XENLT was granted an AM-FM migration as XHNLT-FM on 96.1 MHz. XHNLT signed on at 2:07 pm on March 5, 2018, and formally began operations on April 23. The FM station offers three total subchannels, including the national Segunda Cadena feed and the Trión musical format. XENLT-AM shut down April 23, 2019, after the required year of simulcasting.

External links

References

News and talk radio stations in Mexico
Spanish-language radio stations
Radio stations in Nuevo Laredo
Radio Fórmula